The Critics' Choice Documentary Award for Best Director is one of the awards presented annually by Critics Choice Association since the awards debuted in 2016.

Winners and nominees

2010s

2020s

Multiple nominations

References

External links
Official website

Best Director
Awards established in 2016
Critics' Choice Documentary Awards